Christ Evangelical and Reformed Church, also known as United Church of Fayette, is a historic Evangelical and Reformed church located at Fayette in Seneca County, New York.  It was constructed in 1823 in a simple rectangular formwith gable roof and modest Federal period detailing.  It was updated and its Romanesque qualities enhanced in 1882 with the addition of a four-stage bell tower with Queen Anne decoration. The adjacent cemetery was in use between 1810 and 1926, and the surrounding cast-iron fence was installed in 1877.

It was listed on the National Register of Historic Places in 1989.

References

Churches on the National Register of Historic Places in New York (state)
Reformed Church in America churches in New York (state)
Churches completed in 1810
19th-century Protestant churches
Churches in Seneca County, New York
National Register of Historic Places in Seneca County, New York
Fayette, New York